The Mollestad Oak (in Norwegian: Mollestadeika or Vetteika) is a monumental, legendary oak near the Norwegian village of Mollestad in the municipality of Birkenes, Norway. Estimates of the age are between 450 and 550 years, but there are also outliers to around 1000 years. The oak is traditionally a knot oak and the trunk extends to a height of four meters. The oak is located on a field. In the direction of the oak from the road, there is a grassy strip over which the oak can be reached.

Additional information is also available in English in a post on site.

The legend 
The nickname Vetteika comes from the vættir. She believed that when the farm builder died, he returned as a guardian spirit. The trees that grew around his burial mound were protected and the surrounding land sacred. It was believed that when these trees were damaged this would bring bad luck. To ensure that everything went well, sacrifices were made to the tree, including the first brewed beer of the year.

References 

Birkenes
Tourist attractions in Agder
Individual trees in Norway
Oldest trees
Individual oak trees